Cuffe Parade is a historic and significant business district of the city of Mumbai, India. It is home to a collection of commercial and office high-rises. It is bordered to the north by Nariman Point which, along with Cuffe Parade, forms the greater CBD region of the city.

History
Cuffe Parade was named after T. W. Cuffe of the Bombay City Improvement Trust, which reclaimed around 75,000 m² on the western shore of Colaba. Much of Cuffe Parade was developed on reclaimed land in the 1960s, with many of the buildings over thirty storeys high.

Prior to the mid 2000s, some of the tallest buildings in South Asia were located in Cuffe Parade. Unlike Nariman Point to the North, Cuffe Parade's lack of proximity to major historical sites has allowed construction of towers above 150 metres of height. However, in recent years, residential towers in Parel, along with commercial towers in Mumbai Central have overtaken Cuffe Parade's skyline.

Cuffe Parade has been making a resurgence in recent years, with a slew of residential and commercial towers going up along the bay facing Nariman Point. There are also plans to greenfly the edge of the bay, allowing a seamless park/plaza between Cuffe Parade and Marine Drive.

Overview
To the east is Colaba Causeway and to the west is the Arabian Sea. Among the notable residents are members of the Ambani and Husain families.

 Prominent businessmen living here include Subhash Chandra of Essel Group, the Goenka family, the Patni family, Nimesh Kampani of JM Financial. The skyline consists of prominent buildings like Maker Tower and Jolly Maker-1, considered to be the richest housing society in Mumbai.
 Cuffe Parade Resident Association is a citizen's organisation looking after the interests of the Cuffe Parade area since 1971.
 The slum children of the area are educated by schools organised by Bina Sheth Lashkari.
 MVRDC World Trade Centre I is located at Cuffe Parade in Mumbai, it is 156 metres high and has 35 floors. It is a commercial and shopping complex.
 One of India's top media empires, that of Ronnie Screwvala, started in 1981, right here when he brought one of India's first cable TV channels to Cuffe Parade.

Local landmarks
Taj President Hotel
World Trade Centre
 G D Somani Memorial School
BD Somani International School
Makers Arcade
WIRC of ICAI
Colaba Woods
Mehr Naz building
Cuffe Castle

References

External links
 Cuffe Parade Residents Association (CPRA).
 Cuffe Parade at wikimapia.
 The Times of India

Neighbourhoods in Mumbai